Bülach railway station is a railway station in the Swiss canton of Zürich and municipality of Bülach. It is located at the junction of the Winterthur to Koblenz and Oerlikon to Bülach lines of Swiss Federal Railways.

Bülach is an example of a Keilbahnhof: platforms 1–3 are located on the Oerlikon–Bülach line to the west of the station, while platforms 4–6 are located on the Winterthur–Koblenz line, to the east. The two lines join immediately north of the station facility.

Services
 Bülach station is served by Zürich S-Bahn lines S3, S9, S36 and S41; as well as an hourly RegioExpress (RE) service between Zürich and Schaffhausen (via Oerlikon). The S36 connects Koblenz, while the S41 connects Winterthur using the Winterthur–Bülach–Koblenz railway line. InterCity trains used to call at Bülach station until 2013.

Summary of rail services:

 Zürich S-Bahn:

During weekends, there are also three Nighttime S-Bahn services (SN, SN9, SN41) offered by ZVV.

Gallery

References

External links 
 
 

Bulach
Bulach
Bülach